= Public Seal of the Democratic Socialist Republic of Sri Lanka =

The Public Seal of the Democratic Socialist Republic of Sri Lanka is the official seal of Sri Lanka, used to authorise official instruments of government. The seal is defined by the Constitution of Sri Lanka. The President of Sri Lanka has custody of the seal.
